Maju Herklotz (born 4 November 1975) is a Brazilian fencer. She competed in the women's individual foil event at the 2004 Summer Olympics.

References

1975 births
Living people
Brazilian female foil fencers
Olympic fencers of Brazil
Fencers at the 2004 Summer Olympics
Sportspeople from Rio de Janeiro (city)
21st-century Brazilian women